Philip Lonicer (Philippus Lonicerus; died 1599) was a German historian. Lonicer produced  a Latin version of the Gesta Danorum in 1576, entitled Danica Historia Libris XVI. He was also the rector of the Frankfurt Gymnasium.

16th-century German historians
1599 deaths
Year of birth unknown
German male non-fiction writers